Luis Romero may refer to:

Arts and Entertainment
 Luis T. Romero (1854–1893), American classical guitarist
 Luis Romero (novelist) (1916–2009), Spanish novelist
 Luis Enrique Romero (actor), actor in Dueña y señora
 Luis "Indio" Romero, Argentine theatre director

Sportspeople
 Luis Romero Petit (1917–2017), Venezuelan baseball player
 Luis Romero (Uruguayan footballer) (born 1968), former Uruguayan football striker
 Luis Romero (footballer, born 1984), Ecuadorian football defender
 Luis Romero (footballer, born 1990), Argentine football defender
 Luis Romero (footballer, born 1991), Mexican footballer
 Luis Alberto (footballer, born 1992), Spanish football forward

Other
 Luis Alberto Romero (historian), Argentine scholar and 2005 Guggenheim Fellow